Batrisodes is a genus of ant-loving beetles in the family Staphylinidae. There are at least 80 described species in Batrisodes.

Species
These 89 species belong to the genus Batrisodes:

 Batrisodes adnexus (Hampe, 1863) g
 Batrisodes albionicus (Aubé, 1833) i c g b
 Batrisodes antennatus Schaeffer, 1906 i c g
 Batrisodes aphenogastri Fall, 1912 i c g
 Batrisodes auerbachi Park, 1956 i c g
 Batrisodes babaianus Nomura, 2007 g
 Batrisodes barri Park, 1958 i c g
 Batrisodes beyeri Schaeffer, 1906 i c g b
 Batrisodes bistriatus (LeConte, 1849) i c g
 Batrisodes buqueti (Aubé, 1833) g
 Batrisodes cartwrighti Sanderson, 1940 i c g
 Batrisodes cavernosus Park, 1951 i c g
 Batrisodes cavicornis (Casey, 1897) i c g
 Batrisodes cicatricosus (Brendel, 1891) i c g
 Batrisodes clypeonotus (Brendel, 1893) i c g
 Batrisodes clypeospecus Park, 1960 i c g
 Batrisodes declivis Casey, 1908 i c g b
 Batrisodes delaporti (Aubé, 1833) g
 Batrisodes denticauda (Casey, 1894) i c g
 Batrisodes denticollis (Casey, 1884) i c g b
 Batrisodes elysius (Reitter, 1884) g
 Batrisodes exsculptus (Hampe, 1850) g
 Batrisodes ferulifer Park, 1960 i c g
 Batrisodes festinatus Park, 1956 i c g
 Batrisodes fossicauda (Casey, 1897) i c g
 Batrisodes foveicornis (Casey, 1887) i c g
 Batrisodes frontalis (LeConte, 1849) i c g b
 Batrisodes furcatus (Brendel, 1891) i c g
 Batrisodes gemmoides Park, 1960 i c g
 Batrisodes gemmus Park, 1956 i c g
 Batrisodes grubbsi Chandler, 1992 i c g
 Batrisodes hairstoni Park, 1947 i c g
 Batrisodes henroti Park, 1956 i c g
 Batrisodes hubenthali Reitter, 1913 g
 Batrisodes hubrichti Park, 1958 i c g
 Batrisodes indistinctus Grigarick and Schuster, 1962 i c g
 Batrisodes insularis (Baudi di Selve, 1869) g
 Batrisodes ionae (LeConte, 1849) i c g b
 Batrisodes jocuvestus Park, 1960 i c g
 Batrisodes jonesi Park, 1951 i c g
 Batrisodes juvencus (Brendel, 1865) i c g
 Batrisodes krekeleri Park, 1960 i c g
 Batrisodes lineaticollis (Aubé, 1833) i c g b
 Batrisodes lustrans Casey, 1908 i c g
 Batrisodes martini Grigarick and Schuster, 1962 i c g
 Batrisodes masatakai Nomura, 2007 g
 Batrisodes mendocino (Casey, 1886) i c g b
 Batrisodes mississippiensis Park, 1956 i c g
 Batrisodes monticola (Casey, 1886) i c g
 Batrisodes nebulosus Grigarick and Schuster, 1962 i c g
 Batrisodes nigricans (LeConte, 1849) i c g
 Batrisodes obscurus Grigarick and Schuster, 1962 i c g
 Batrisodes occiduus (Casey, 1886) i c g
 Batrisodes oculatus (Aubé, 1833) g
 Batrisodes opacus Grigarick and Schuster, 1962 i c g
 Batrisodes oro Chandler, 1983 i c g
 Batrisodes paganettii W.Blattny & C.Blattny, 1916 g
 Batrisodes pannosus Park, 1960 i c g
 Batrisodes pogonatus (Saulcy, 1874) g
 Batrisodes profundus Park, 1956 i c g
 Batrisodes punctifrons (Casey, 1887) i c g
 Batrisodes reyesi Chandler, 1992 i c g
 Batrisodes riparius (Say, 1824) i c g
 Batrisodes rossi Park, 1947 i c g
 Batrisodes scabriceps (LeConte, 1849) i c g
 Batrisodes schaefferi Park, 1947 i c g
 Batrisodes schaumi (Aubé, 1844) i c g
 Batrisodes schmitti (Casey, 1897) i c g
 Batrisodes sinuatifrons (Brendel, 1893) i c g
 Batrisodes speculum (Casey, 1886) i c g
 Batrisodes specus Park, 1951 i c g
 Batrisodes spinifer (Brendel, 1887) i c g
 Batrisodes spretus (LeConte, 1849) i c g
 Batrisodes striatus (LeConte, 1849) i c g
 Batrisodes subterraneus Park, 1951 i c g
 Batrisodes sulcaticeps Besuchet, 1981 g
 Batrisodes temporalis (Casey, 1897) i c g
 Batrisodes texanus Chandler, 1992 i c g b (Coffin Cave mold beetle)
 Batrisodes tulareanus Casey, 1908 i c g
 Batrisodes tumoris Park, 1960 i c g
 Batrisodes uncicornis (Casey, 1897) i c g
 Batrisodes unisexualis Besuchet, 1988 g
 Batrisodes valentinei Park, 1951 i c g
 Batrisodes venustus (Reichenbach, 1816) g
 Batrisodes venyivi Chandler, 1992 i c g b (helotes mold beetle)
 Batrisodes virginiae (Casey, 1884) i c
 Batrisodes wardi Chandler, 2003 i c g
 Batrisodes yanaorum Chandler, 2003 i c g
 Batrisodes zephyrinus (Casey, 1886) i c g
 
Data sources: i = ITIS, c = Catalogue of Life, g = GBIF, b = Bugguide.net

References 

 Two new species of Batrisodes Reitter (Coleoptera: Staphylinidae: Pselaphinae) from China. Jiang, R-X. and Yin, Z-W., 2016, Zootaxa, 4205 (2), pages 194–200,

External links 

 
 
 
 Batrisodes  at insectoid.info

Pselaphinae genera